Ivo Karlović was the defending champion from when the tournament was last held in 2008, but chose not to participate.

Denis Istomin won the title, defeating Sam Querrey in the final, 7–6(7–1), 7–6(8–6).

Seeds
All seeds receive a bye into the second round.

Draw

Finals

Top half

Section 1

Section 2

Bottom half

Section 3

Section 4

Qualifying

Seeds

Qualifiers

Qualifying draw

First qualifier

Second qualifier

Third qualifier

Fourth qualifier

References
 Main Draw
 Qualifying Draw

2015 ATP World Tour
2015 Men's Singles